Çeştepe  is a town in the central district of Aydın Province, Turkey. At   it is almost merged to Aydın city center.  The population of the town was 5552 as of 2012. According to the mayor's webpage, the town was founded by Circassian refugees from the Balkans and the Caucasus during the last years of the Ottoman Empire. Çeştepe was declared a seat of township in 1992.

References

Populated places in Aydın Province
Towns in Turkey
Efeler District